Petrus Joseph Johannes (Jan) Mertens (14 July 1916 in Heerlen – 2 August 2000 in Oosterhout) was a Dutch politician.

References
Biography in the Biografisch Woordenboek van Nederland

1916 births
2000 deaths
Catholic People's Party politicians
20th-century Dutch politicians
State Secretaries for Social Affairs of the Netherlands
Dutch trade unionists
People from Heerlen
Dutch Roman Catholics
21st-century Dutch politicians